The Sea Fleet Command (COFM) is one of the commands in the Argentine Navy, headquartered at Puerto Belgrano Naval Base (BNPB).

Mission
The Sea Fleet is in charge of the integrated naval training, counts on marines unit and a naval aviation unit attached.

Current composition

Destroyers Division
Mission: Surface warfare, submarine warfare, anti-missile and electronic warfare
Ships:
 - Almirante Brown-class destroyer
 - Almirante Brown-class destroyer
 - Almirante Brown-class destroyer (inactive)
 - Almirante Brown-class destroyer

Frigates & Corvettes Division
Mission: Sea control, surface warfare, submarine warfare, anti-missile and electronic warfare
Ships:
 - Espora-class corvette
 - Espora-class corvette 
 - Espora-class corvette
 - Espora-class corvette
 - Espora-class corvette
 - Espora-class corvette
 ARA Drummond (P-31) - Drummond-class corvette (in reserve)
 ARA Guerrico (P-32) - Drummond-class corvette (in reserve)
 ARA Granville (P-33) - Drummond-class corvette (active)

Naval Amphibious and Logistic Command
Mission: Planning and execution of amphibious warfare, anti-aircraft warfare and logistical support of the fleet
Ships:
 multi-purpose transport ship converted from a Type 42 destroyer (inactive)
 Durance-class tanker (inactive)
 Costa Sur-class cargo ship
 Costa Sur-class amphibious cargo ship
 multipurpose auxiliary ship
 Marsea-class aviso
 Neftegaz-class aviso
 Neftegaz-class aviso
 Neftegaz-class aviso

Fleet Naval Infantry Force

Embarked Air Group

2nd Naval Air Helicopters Squadron Sikorsky S-61D-4 Sea King helicopter on Almirante Irízar icebreaker.
3rd Naval Air Helicopters Squadron Eurocopter AS555 SN Fennec 2 helicopter on MEKO-360 and MEKO-140 ships.

Falklands War

See also

Argentine Marines
Argentine Naval Aviation
Argentine Submarines Force

References

External links
ara.mil.ar/
FuerzasNavales.com
Gaceta Marinera

Naval units and formations of Argentina